The 1951 Georgia Bulldogs football team represented the Georgia Bulldogs of the University of Georgia during the 1951 college football season.

Schedule

Roster
Zeke Bratkowski, So.

References

Georgia
Georgia Bulldogs football seasons
Georgia Bulldogs football